Shira Haas (born ) is an Israeli actress. She initially gained national prominence for her roles in local film and television, having won two Israeli Ophir Awards out of five nominations since 2014. In 2020, she gained international acclaim for her role in the Netflix miniseries Unorthodox. For this performance, she was nominated for a Golden Globe Award and a Primetime Emmy Award. In the same year, Haas won the Tribeca Film Festival Award for Best International Actress for her performance in the Israeli drama film Asia (2020).

Early life
Haas was born in Tel Aviv, Israel, to a secular Jewish family. Her parents, both Israeli-born Jews (also known as "Sabra"), are of Ashkenazi Jewish (Polish-Jewish, Hungarian-Jewish, and Czech-Jewish) descent. Her grandparents are both Holocaust survivors; her grandfather had been imprisoned in the Auschwitz concentration camp during World War II. In Hebrew, her first name literally means either the noun "singing" or "her song". When she was one year old, her family moved to the city of Hod HaSharon, Israel, where she grew up with her older sister and brother. At age two, Haas was diagnosed with kidney cancer, and recovered two years later after a series of severe treatments. On 3 August 2022, her mother Ariela "Leah" Haas died of cancer, after weeks in hospice, at age 61. 

She attended the Thelma Yellin High School of Arts in Givatayim, Israel, majoring in theatre, before completing a short period of volunteer service in the Israel Defense Forces' military theatre. In late April 2020, she joined a virtual ceremony celebrating Israel's 72nd Independence Day, and sent birthday wishes to Israel with fellow Jewish actors Ben Platt and Josh Malina.

Career

2010–2014: Early career and Princess debut
At age 14, she began performing in plays at the Tel Aviv's Cameri Theater, such as Ghetto (2010) and Richard III. She made her television debut as the role of Haredi girl Ruchami Weiss in the Israeli drama series Shtisel in 2013. While attending Thelma Yellin, Haas was approached by an Israeli casting director by the name of Esther Kling via Facebook message in 2014. She encouraged Haas to audition for the lead role in the Israeli film Princess (2014). After getting her debut role at the age of 16, Haas was praised by The New York Times for her "truly remarkable lead performance", and was admired by The Hollywood Reporter for fitting the part of a 12-year-old character with her "petite frame and baby-smooth complexion". The role won her the awards for Best Actress at both the Jerusalem Film Festival and the Peace & Love Film Festival, as well as a nomination for Best Leading Actress at the Israeli Ophir Awards.

2015–2017: Hollywood debut
Haas made her first appearance in an international film when she played the role of young Fania in compatriot Natalie Portman's directorial-debut, A Tale of Love and Darkness (2015). Haas also appeared alongside Jessica Chastain in Niki Caro's The Zookeeper's Wife (2017), which led to her American talk show debut on The Today Show in 2016. Haas auditioned for the role over Skype call. She earned her second Israeli Ophir Award nomination for Best Supporting Actress in Foxtrot (2017), which made the final shortlist for the 90th Academy Award for Best Foreign Language Film.

2018–2019: National breakthrough 
By the start of 2018, Haas had made a name for herself in many prime time Israeli drama television shows: Shtisel (2013–2020), The Jeweler (2015), The Switch Principle (2016), Harem (2017) and The Conductor (2018). At the 2018 Israeli Ophir Awards, Haas was nominated for both Best Leading Actress for Broken Mirrors (2018) and Best Supporting Actress for Noble Savage (2018), the latter of which she won. In 2018, she appeared as Leah in Mary Magdalene, written by Helen Edmundson and directed by Garth Davis. She made the Israeli Forbes list of 30 under 30 in February 2019, before appearing alongside Harvey Keitel in the second biblical film in her acting career, Esau (2019).

2020–present: International breakthrough with Unorthodox

Haas arrived in Berlin, Germany, two months ahead of the shooting of the 2020 German limited Netflix series Unorthodox,  in order to study the Yiddish language which would be primarily spoken in the series. Besides Yiddish lessons, Haas was required to shave her head and also completed both piano and singing lessons to prepare for the role of Esther "Esty" Shapiro, who runs away from her arranged marriage and Ultra-Orthodox community in Williamsburg, Brooklyn, New York City. The series is based on the true life story of Deborah Feldman, who wrote an autobiography of the same name. 

James Poniewozik of The New York Times described Haas as "a phenomenon, expressive and captivating." Brigid Delaney of The Guardian described her as "mesmerising" and "outstanding," noting, "physically tiny, like a child, the viewer is immediately protective of her." Sheena Scott of Forbes wrote that Haas "offers an incredible performance as Esty, full of subtlety, delicately revealing her character's inner struggle and happiness without needing to say a word." Hank Stuever of The Washington Post wrote that she "lends a grave and yet vulnerable luminescence to the role." At the 72nd Primetime Emmy Awards, Haas was nominated for Best Lead Actress in a Limited Series for this performance, becoming the first Israeli to be nominated for an acting Primetime Emmy Award.

Haas acted alongside Alena Yiv in the role of a daughter who becomes confined to a wheelchair in the Israeli film Asia (2020), which was premiered online at the 2020 Tribeca Film Festival, due to the COVID-19 pandemic. The role earned Haas the award for Best International Actress at the festival. The jury wrote, "Her face is a never-ending landscape in which even the tiniest expression is heartbreaking; she's an incredibly honest and present actress who brings depth to everything she does." Her performance in the film also earned her the award for Best Supporting Actress at the 30th Israeli Ophir Awards. Haas was signed to Creative Artists Agency in June 2020.

In September 2022, Marvel Studios officially announced that Haas will portray their Israeli superheroine of Sabra in the upcoming Marvel Cinematic Universe sequel film Captain America: New World Order, scheduled for release in 2024.

Personal life 
As of April 2020, Haas resides in Tel Aviv, Israel.

Filmography

Film

Television

Awards and nominations

Israeli Film Academy Awards (Ophir Awards)

Other awards

See also 

 List of Jews in the performing arts
 List of Israelis

References

External links
 

1995 births
Living people
People from Hod HaSharon
Israeli child actresses
Israeli film actresses
Israeli Jews
Israeli Ashkenazi Jews
Israeli people of Czech-Jewish descent
Israeli people of Hungarian-Jewish descent
Israeli people of Polish-Jewish descent
Israeli television actresses
Jewish Israeli actresses
Thelma Yellin High School of Arts alumni
20th-century Israeli women
21st-century Israeli actresses